National Secondary Route 122, or just Route 122 (or ) is a National Road Route of Costa Rica, located in the Alajuela, Heredia provinces.

Description
In Alajuela province the route covers Alajuela canton (San Antonio, Guácima, San Rafael districts).

In Heredia province the route covers Belén canton (San Antonio district).

References

Highways in Costa Rica